Sclerolaena diacantha, the grey copperburr, is a species of flowering plant in the family Amaranthaceae, native to Australia (except Tasmania). It is a perennial rounded subshrub reaching , with a widespread distribution.

References

diacantha
Endemic flora of Australia
Plants described in 1870